Serratus may refer to any of several muscles in the thorax (trunk). See:
Serratus anterior muscle
Serratus posterior superior muscle
Serratus posterior inferior muscle

Notes

Muscles of the torso